Norman McEachern (5 December 1899 – 19 March 1986) was an Irish middle-distance runner. He competed in the 800 metres at the 1924 Summer Olympics and the 1928 Summer Olympics.

References

External links
 

1899 births
1986 deaths
Athletes (track and field) at the 1924 Summer Olympics
Athletes (track and field) at the 1928 Summer Olympics
Irish male middle-distance runners
Olympic athletes of Ireland
Place of birth missing